Zeenat Begum (born Shamim Akhtar; 11 November 1931  11 December 2007), sometimes known as Zeenat, was a Pakistani singer. She was known as The Queen of Yesteryear for singing songs in films and on radio.

Early life
Zeenat Begum was born Shamim Akhtar in 1931 on November 11th at Malerkotla, Punjab, British India.

Music career
Zeenat Begum was a courtesan (kothewali) and a renowned classical singer. She was discovered by Pandit Amar Nath around 1937. Her first success as a playback singer came in 1942 when she sang for Govind Ram's Punjabi film Mangti (1942) and she also made her debut as an actress in the film. The film was marked as the first Golden jubilee film produced in Lahore.

Her first Hindi film was Nishani (1942). She sang for other notable films including Panchhi (1944), Shalimar (1946), Shehar se Door (1946) and Daasi (1944).

Zeenat Begum migrated from Lahore to Bombay in 1944. She sang for several music directors in Bombay, including younger brothers of Pandit Amar Nath – Pandit Husnlal Bhagatram, Master Ghulam Haider, Pandit Gobind Ram etc. The last film she sang for in India was Mukhda (1951). She migrated to Pakistan and joined Lahore Radio station and worked there until the late 1950s. After the independence of Pakistan in 1947, many new playback singers arrived in Pakistan which affected the playback singing career of Zeenat Begum. Though she remained a prominent singer of Radio Lahore in 1950s and 1960s.

Personal life
Zeenat married Abdul Jabbar, they later divorced in 1955. Later she married Saqlain Rizvi and they had one child together.

Death
She died on 11th December 2007 in Lahore, Pakistan.

Filmography

Film

References

External links
 

Indian women classical singers
Pakistani women singers
Pakistani classical singers
Pakistani playback singers
Pakistani radio personalities
Indian women playback singers
Indian courtesans
2007 deaths
Punjabi women
Singers from Lahore
Punjabi-language singers
Radio personalities from Lahore
Punjabi people
Bollywood playback singers 
20th-century Indian singers
20th-century Indian women singers
1931 births
20th-century Pakistani actresses
20th-century Pakistani women singers
People from British India
21st-century Pakistani women singers
Pakistani film actresses
21st-century Pakistani actresses